A psychiatric assistance dog or psychiatric service dog is a sub-category of assistance dog trained to assist their handler with a psychiatric disability or a mental disability, such as obsessive-compulsive disorder, post-traumatic stress disorder, schizophrenia, depression, anxiety, and bipolar disorder.

A psychiatric assistance dog can assist their handler by providing a safe presence that grounds them; the dog may perhaps lean on the person to provide a calming pressure.

Training 

Like all assistance dogs, a psychiatric assistance dog is individually trained to do work or perform tasks that mitigate their handler's disability.
Training to mitigate a psychiatric disability may include providing environmental assessment (in such cases as paranoia or hallucinations), signaling behaviors (such as interrupting repetitive or injurious behaviors), reminding the handler to take medication, retrieving objects, guiding the handler from stressful situations, or acting as a brace if the handler becomes dizzy. Moreover, the dog can be an extremely useful companion in any controlled training concerning cognitive functions, such as walking the dog.

Many psychiatric assistance dogs are trained by the person who will become the handler—usually with the help of a professional trainer. Others are trained by assistance or service dog programs.  Assistance dog organizations are increasingly recognizing the need for dogs to help individuals with psychiatric disabilities, and there are even organizations dedicated specifically to supporting psychiatric assistance dog handlers.

Accessibility 

In the US, the Air Carrier Access Act has permitted psychiatric service dogs animals to travel in the cabin with their handler. Due to negative incidents with services dogs and emotional support animals, from 2018 through 2020 there has been a push to limit or restrict dogs on US flights. During this time the act treated psychiatric service dogs and emotional support animals the same and required the handler to provide paperwork for their dog. In December 2020, a revision of the act meant that the two were no longer treated the same, and psychiatric service dogs were treated the same as other types of service dogs.

See also
 Assistance dog
 Autism assistance dog

References

External links
 Americans with Disabilities Act of 1990, as amended

Assistance dogs

nl:ADL-hond
no:Servicehund